Big Rock Creek is a stream in Beltrami and Clearwater counties, Minnesota, in the United States.

Big Rock was named from two large boulders near its mouth.

See also
List of rivers of Minnesota

References

Rivers of Beltrami County, Minnesota
Rivers of Clearwater County, Minnesota
Rivers of Minnesota